Buona vita (good life) may refer to:

Music
Buona Vita (Gigi D'Alessio album), 2003
Buona Vita (Katy Garbi album)
"Buona Vita", song by Eros Ramazzotti Dove c'è musica 2006
"Buona Vita", song by Ornella Vanoni, 2007, re-recorded as duet Katy Garbi
"Buona Vita", song by Liana Orfei

Other
Buona Vita, clothing retail shop in Japan, Shakujii-kōen Station

See also
Bella Vita (disambiguation)